Bart James Tanski (born January 7, 1990) is a former American football player who played wide receiver for the Bowling Green Falcons. He is from Mentor, Ohio and was the 2007 Ohio Mr. Football Award winner.

Playing career

High school
Bart was the quarterback at Mentor High School, where he led his team to two OHSAA Division I state title games in 2006 and 2007 (losing both). Bart won the Mr. Football Award in 2007; given to the best high school football player in the state of Ohio—Mentor High's first as well.

College
Despite being named Ohio's Mr. Football, Bart struggled to earn an NCAA Division I scholarship for football.  He ultimately walked on the team at Bowling Green State University.

For his senior season in 2012 Tanski was named team captain for Bowling Green.

Coaching career
Tanski became an assistant coach for the Syracuse Orange football team after being a graduate assistant for the Findlay Oilers. Tanski now serves as cornerbacks coach for Robert Morris Colonials football.

References

1990 births
Living people
People from Mentor, Ohio
Players of American football from Ohio
Sportspeople from Greater Cleveland
Mentor High School alumni